Lady, Play Your Mandolin! is the first Warner Bros. Merrie Melodies cartoon, directed by Rudolf Ising of Harman and Ising. The short was released in August 1931, and stars Foxy, a character who appeared in three 1931 shorts.

Overview 

The cartoon features Foxy as a gaucho. He visits a local saloon which is disguised as a café, reflecting that when this cartoon was made, Prohibition was law of the land in the United States. Also, as a reflection of Prohibition, liquor bottles have skull and crossbones labels. His horse soon finds himself drunk and begins to hallucinate wildly. Similarly to Foxy, the cartoon features a female fox character that is very reminiscent of Minnie Mouse.

As was typically the case with the early entries in the Merrie Melodies series, one purpose of the cartoon was to promote a Warner-owned popular song. The title theme, written by Oscar Levant with lyrics by Irving Caesar, was a 1930 #5 pop hit sung by Nick Lucas and released by Brunswick Records, which had been purchased by Warner Bros. the previous year (Another recording, by the Havana Novelty Orchestra was released the same year on RCA's Victor Records). In the short, it is sung by a female fox character who would later become Foxy's girlfriend, Roxy.

The credited animators were Rollin "Ham" Hamilton and Norm Blackburn (plus uncredited animation by Isadore Freleng, Robert Clampett (his first cartoon at WB according to some sources) and Carman Maxwell) with a musical score and direction of the Abe Lyman (Brunswick Recording) Orchestra by Frank Marsales. Rudolf Ising provides the voice of Foxy, while Harman-Ising regular Rochelle Hudson as well as Abe Lyman (and probably members of his band) provide the other voices.

Home media 
The cartoon is available as an extra on the Little Caesar DVD and Blu-ray. It is also available on the DVD 'Attack of the '30's Characters', albeit in an unrestored form. In 2003, it was included within bonus features on Disc 3 of the Looney Tunes Golden Collection: Volume 1.

References

External links 

 
 Lady, Play Your Mandolin! at the Big Cartoon Database
 Lady, Play Your Mandolin! Sheet Music at the Mississippi State University Digital Library
 Lady, Play Your Mandolin! on YouTube

1931 films
1931 animated films
1931 Western (genre) films
Merrie Melodies short films
Warner Bros. Cartoons animated short films
American black-and-white films
Films scored by Frank Marsales
Animated films about foxes
Films directed by Rudolf Ising
Foxy (Merrie Melodies) films
Films set in Mexico
American Western (genre) films
Animated films about animals
1930s Warner Bros. animated short films
1930s English-language films